Joe Winn Crousen Jr. (March 22, 1941 – July 27, 2012) was an American football player and coach. He served as the head football coach at McMurry College in Abilene, Texas from 2005 to 2006, compiling a record of 8–12. He previously served as an assistant football coach at Mississippi State University under the leadership of Emory Bellard in 1978.

References

1941 births
2012 deaths
Angelo State Rams football players
McMurry War Hawks football coaches
Mississippi State Bulldogs football coaches
Ranger Rangers football coaches
Sul Ross Lobos football players
High school football coaches in Texas
People from Breckenridge, Texas
People from Quantico, Virginia
Players of American football from Texas